Girawa may be,

Girawa (woreda), Ethiopia
Girawa language, New Guinea